Sumaiyah Bibi is a Pakistani politician who is the member of the Provincial Assembly of Khyber Pakhtunkhwa.

Political career
Sumaiyah was elected to the Provincial Assembly of Khyber Pakhtunkhwa as a candidate of Pakistan Tehreek-e-Insaf (PTI) on a reserved seat for women in consequence of 2018 Pakistani general election. She assumed the membership of the assembly on 15 October 2018.

References

Living people
Pakistan Tehreek-e-Insaf politicians
Politicians from Khyber Pakhtunkhwa
Year of birth missing (living people)